St. George & St. Mary Mother of God Macedonian Orthodox Church (Makedonska Pravoslavna Crkva „Sv. Ǵorǵi i Presveta Bogorodica“) is the Macedonian Orthodox church located in Epping, a suburb of northern Melbourne, Victoria, Australia. Constructed in 1995, the church is built next to the Macedonian Community Centre.  Attendance by parishioners averages at some 200 per liturgy. Orthodox services are conducted in Macedonian. From the late 2010s English language services are also performed, due to the changing needs of the congregation.

Gallery

See also 

 Macedonian Australians

References

External links 
Facebook

Macedonian Orthodox churches in Melbourne
1995 establishments in Australia
Churches completed in 1995
Macedonian-Australian culture
Buildings and structures in the City of Whittlesea